Back from Nicaragua is a 1984 documentary film directed by filmmaker Julio Emilio Moliné. Written and hosted by Nina Serrano, it features interviews and performances with Joan Baez, Holly Near, Pete Seeger, The Looters and Sebastopol, California Reverend Don Chase about their visits to Nicaragua. Julio Emilio Moliné also directed the 1981 film Joan Baez in Latin America: There but for fortune.

References

External Links
Back from Nicaragua (1984) at Estuary Press

Documentary films about music and musicians
1984 films
1984 documentary films